Fielding, Saskatchewan is an unincorporated area in the rural municipality of Mayfield No. 406, Saskatchewan, in the Canadian province of Saskatchewan.  Fielding is located on Saskatchewan Highway 16, the Yellowhead in north western Saskatchewan.  Fielding post office first opened in 1905 at the legal land description of Sec.18, Twp.41, R.11, W3.  The population is smaller than a hamlet, and is counted within the Mayfield No. 406, Saskatchewan.  Fielding is located just south east of North Battleford, Saskatchewan.  Fielding is located within  of Glenburn Regional Park and within  of the Radisson Lake Game Preserve.

Area statistics
Lat (DMS) 52°31′00″ N
Long (DMS) 107°32′00″ W
Dominion Land Survey Sec.18, Twp.41, R.11, W3
Time zone (cst) UTC−6

Location

See also

List of communities in Saskatchewan
List of rural municipalities in Saskatchewan

Notes

External links

Saskatchewan City & Town Maps
Saskatchewan Gen Web - One Room School Project 
Post Offices and Postmasters - ArchiviaNet - Library and Archives Canada
Saskatchewan Gen Web Region
Online Historical Map Digitization Project
GeoNames Query 
2006 Community Profiles 

Mayfield No. 406, Saskatchewan
Former villages in Saskatchewan
Division No. 16, Saskatchewan